Grabówka   is a village in the administrative district of Gmina Mikołajki, within Mrągowo County, Warmian-Masurian Voivodeship, in northern Poland.

Location

History

References

Villages in Mrągowo County